This is a list of castles in Yemen.

References 

Yemen
Yemen
Castles
Yemen
Castles